Apatetris echiochilonella is a moth of the family Gelechiidae. It was described by Pierre Chrétien in 1908. It is found in Algeria.

The wingspan is about 12 mm.

The larvae feed on Echiochilon fruticosum.

References

Moths described in 1908
Apatetris
Moths of Africa